KiWi Radio was an American teen hits radio show targeted to a 12-17 age demographic. It focused on playing contemporary hit radio (CHR) music, also known as Top 40 and songs from teen artists, such as Miley Cyrus, Demi Lovato, The Jonas Brothers, Vanessa Hudgens, etc.

The 2 hour syndicated radio show was hosted by a new celebrity each week, and previously aired on four stations, KVUU "My 99.9" in Colorado Springs, KSME "96.1 Kiss FM" in Ft. Collins, KRQQ "93.7 KRQ" in Tucson and WDKS "106.1 Kiss Fm in Evansville. KiWi Radio was programmed by Chris Pickett, also program director of KVUU in Colorado Springs.

KiWi Radio ended its two-year run in July 2010.

Hosts
A few former KiWi Radio Hosts:

 Miley Cyrus
 Corbin Bleu
 The Pussycat Dolls
 Jesse McCartney
 Daughtry
 Metro Station
 Fall Out Boy
 Jason Mraz
 Miranda Cosgrove
 The Ting Tings
 Tiffany Thornton
 Kristinia DeBarge
 Clique Girlz
 All-American Rejects
 Emily Osment
 Jordan Pruitt
 Natasha Bedingfield
 Nick Lachey
 The White Tie Affair
 Bow Wow
 Demi Lovato
 Jonas Brothers
 David Archuleta
 Jason Derulo
 Justin Bieber
 Mitchel Musso

References

KiWi Radio MySpace Page
KiWi Radio Twitter

American music radio programs